Madison Reyes (born June 25, 2004) is an American actress and singer, who is known for playing the character Julie Molina in the Netflix musical series Julie and the Phantoms (2020), for which she won an MTV Award and received a nomination for a Daytime Emmy Award.

Life and career 
Reyes was born to Puerto Rican parents in Brooklyn, New York, where she was raised. She moved to Allentown, Pennsylvania at age 10.

In 2020, she made her on-screen debut as Julie Molina in the Netflix series, Julie and the Phantoms. Scouted by director Kenny Ortega, she was cast at age 14 to portray the main character in the series. Reyes also performs in the series soundtrack, which includes "Perfect Harmony", written and performed with co-star Charlie Gillespie. Reyes and her fellow cast members won an MTV Movie Award for Best Musical Moment. She received a Daytime Emmy Award nomination for Outstanding Younger Performer in a Daytime Fiction Program in 2021.

On July 16, 2021, Reyes released her first song, "Te Amo". On June 3, 2022, she released her debut EP, All Kinds of Love.

Filmography

Television

Discography

Singles 

2004 births
American actresses of Puerto Rican descent
Living people

Soundtrack albums

Awards and Nominations

References

External links 

 
 Madison Reyes on Instagram

2004 births
American actresses of Puerto Rican descent
Living people